The Howard Hotel is a historic hotel in Brigham City, Utah, United States, that is listed on the National Register of Historic Places (NRHP).

Description
The former hotel is located at 35 South Main Street (Utah State Route 13). It was built as a two-story, brick and adobe hotel around 1903, and was expanded by addition of a third story in 1914. The hotel has a red brick front facade and third-story side walls, the lower side walls are adobe. It was further modified in 1923 and in 1934.

It was designed by C.F. Wells and built by contractor Lorenzo Peterson. It has also been known as the Utah-Na Hotel, as the Wasatch Hotel, and as the Boothe Hotel. It was in use as a Greyhound bus station in 1946.

The building was listed on the NRHP October 7, 1994.

Gallery

See also

 National Register of Historic Places listings in Box Elder County, Utah

References

External links

Hotels in Utah
National Register of Historic Places in Box Elder County, Utah
Neoclassical architecture in Utah
Buildings and structures completed in 1903
1903 establishments in Utah